The Bushwick School for Social Justice (BSSJ) is a small public high school in the neighborhood of Bushwick, Brooklyn, New York City, one of four schools currently occupying the Bushwick Campus. Enrollment is approximately 425 students. The school is partnered with Make the Road New York, Brooklyn College, and the Institute for Student Achievement (ISA). It was founded by Terry C. Byam, Matt Corallo, Matthew Ritter, and Mark Rush. It opened in 2003, graduated its first class in 2007, and has received an 'A' rating for the last five years. Terry C. Byam was the founding principal. The current principal is Ana Marsh.

See also
New York City Department of Education
List of high schools in New York City

Notes

External links
InsideSchools.org: Bushwick High School for Social Justice
Coalition of Essential Schools: Bushwick School for Social Justice
New York City Department of Education: Buschwick School for Social Justice

Public high schools in Brooklyn
Bushwick, Brooklyn
Social justice organizations